William Lettsom may refer to:
 William Nanson Lettsom, English man of letters
 William Garrow Lettsom, British diplomat, mineralogist and spectroscopist